Ugo Eugenio Prat, better known as Hugo Pratt (15 June 1927 – 20 August 1995), was an Italian comic book creator who was known for combining strong storytelling with extensive historical research on works such as Corto Maltese. He was inducted into the Will Eisner Award Hall of Fame in 2005. In 1946 Hugo Pratt became part of the so-called Group of Venice with Fernando Carcupino, Dino Battaglia and Damiano Damiani.

Biography

Early years
Born in Rimini, Italy to Rolando Prat and Evelina (Genero) Prat, Ugo Eugenio Prat spent much of his childhood in Venice in a very cosmopolitan family environment. His paternal grandfather Joseph was Catholic of English and Provencal origins, his maternal grandfather was of hidden Jewish descent and his grandmother was of Turkish origin. In 1937, Pratt moved with his mother to Abyssinia (Ethiopia), joining his father who had moved there following the conquest of that country by Benito Mussolini's Italy. Pratt's father, a MVSN NCO, was captured in 1941 by British troops and, in late 1942, died from disease as a prisoner of war. The same year, Hugo Pratt and his mother were interned in a prison camp at Dirédaoua, where he would buy comics from guards, and later was sent back to Italy by the Red Cross.

After the war, Pratt moved to Venice where he organized entertainment for the Allied troops. Later Pratt joined the 'Venice Group' with other Italian cartoonists, including Alberto Ongaro, Gian Carlo Guarda and Mario Faustinelli. Their magazine Asso di Picche, launched in 1945 as Albo Uragano, concentrated on adventure comics. The magazine scored some success and published works by young talents, including Dino Battaglia. His eponymous character Asso di Picche (Ace of Spades) was a success, mainly in Argentina, where Pratt was invited in 1949.

Argentine years

In the late 1940s, he moved to Buenos Aires where he worked for Argentine publisher Editorial Abril and met Argentine comics artists like  Alberto Breccia and Solano López. The passage to Editorial Frontera saw the publication of some of his most important early series. These included Sgt. Kirk and Ernie Pike, written by Héctor Germán Oesterheld.

Pratt taught drawing in the Escuela Panamericana de Arte directed by Enrique Lipszyc. He often travelled to South American destinations like the Amazon and Mato Grosso. During that period he produced his first comic book as a complete author, both writing and illustrating Anna della jungla (Ann of the Jungle), which was followed by the similar Capitan Cormorant and Wheeling. The latter was completed after his return to Italy.

Return to Italy and the creation of Corto Maltese

From the summer of 1959 to the summer of 1960, Pratt lived in London where he drew a series of war comics for Fleetway Publications, with British scriptwriters. He then returned to Argentina, despite the harsh economic times there. From there, he moved again to Italy in 1962 where he started a collaboration with the children's comic book magazine Il Corriere dei Piccoli, for which he adapted several classics of adventure literature, including Treasure Island and Kidnapped by Robert Louis Stevenson.

In 1967, Pratt met Florenzo Ivaldi; the two created a comics magazine named after his character, Il Sergente Kirk, the hero first written by  Héctor Oesterheld. In the first issue, Pratt's most famous story was published: Una ballata del mare salato (A Ballad of the Salt Sea), which introduced his best known character, Corto Maltese.

Corto's series continued three years later in the French magazine Pif gadget. Due to his rather mixed family ancestry, Pratt had learned snippets of things like kabbalism and much history. Many of his stories are placed in real historical eras and deal with real events: the 1755 war between French and British colonists in Ticonderoga, colonial wars in Africa and both World Wars, for example. Pratt did exhaustive research for factual and visual details, and some characters are real historical figures or loosely based on them, like Corto's main friend/enemy, Rasputin. Many of the minor characters cross over into other stories in a way that places all of Pratt’s stories into the same continuum.

Pratt's main series in the second part of his career include Gli scorpioni del deserto (five stories) and Jesuit Joe. He also wrote stories for his friend and pupil Milo Manara for Tutto ricominciò con un'estate indiana and El Gaucho.

Later years 
From 1970 to 1984, Pratt lived mainly in France where Corto Maltese, a psychologically very complex character resulting from the travel experiences and the endless inventive capacity of his author, became the main character of a comics series. Initially published from 1970 to 1973 by the magazine Pif gadget, it brought him much popular and critical success. Later published in album format, this series was eventually translated into fifteen languages. From 1984-95, he lived in Switzerland where the international success that Corto Maltese sparked continued to grow. In France, most of his pre-Corto Maltese works were published in several album editions by publishers such as Casterman, Dargaud, and Humanoides Associés. A wanderer by nature, Hugo Pratt continued to travel from Canada to Patagonia, from Africa to the Pacific area. He died of bowel cancer on 20 August 1995.

Pratt cited authors like Robert Louis Stevenson, James Oliver Curwood, Zane Grey, Kenneth Roberts, Henry De Vere Stacpoole, Joseph Conrad, Fenimore Cooper, Herman Melville and Jack London as influences, along with cartoonists Lyman Young, Will Eisner, and especially Milton Caniff.

On Friday, 15 July 2005, at San Diego Comic-Con's 17th Annual Will Eisner Comic Industry Awards, he was one of four professionals that year inducted into the Comic Book Hall of Fame.

One of the series created by Pratt, entitled "The Scorpions of the Desert" in English, has been continued after Pratt's death. In 2005 a sixth volume in this series was released, drawn by Pierre Wazeem and entitled "Le chemin de fièvre". A seventh album was scheduled by the French publishers Casterman for release in March 2008. Casterman have also on several occasions hinted at the possible future release of a further episode in the Corto Maltese saga.

In 2015, IDW Publishing's EuroComics imprint launched the definitive English-language edition of Corto Maltese, with new translations made from Pratt's original Italian scripts.

Awards
 1974: Prix Saint-Michel, for the best realistic story
 1976: Angoulême Festival, Best foreign realistic comic book, for La ballade de la mer salée
 1981: Angoulême Festival, Elle award
 1987: Angoulême Festival, Best foreign comic book, for Indian Summer
 1988: Angoulême Festival, 15th anniversary special Grand Prix de la ville d'Angoulême
 1996: Max & Moritz Prizes, Germany, Best German language comic import, for Saint-Exupéry - le dernier vol
 2005: Inducted into the Will Eisner Award Hall of Fame

Main works 
Asso di Picche (L'As de pique, Ace of Spades, 1945–1949)
El Sargento Kirk (Sgt. Kirk, 1953–1959), written by Héctor Oesterheld
Ticonderoga (1957–1958), written by Héctor Oesterheld
Ernie Pike (1957–1959), written by Héctor Oesterheld
Ann y Dan (Anna nella giungla, Ann of the Jungle, Ann de la jungle, 1959)
Capitan Cormorant (1962)
Wheeling (1962)
Corto Maltese (1967–1992)
Una ballata del mare salato (1967) - translated into English as Ballad of The Salt Sea (Harvill Press 1996)
Il segreto di Tristan Bantam (1970)
Corto toujours un peu plus loin - partly translated into English as The Banana Conga (1970-1971)
Le Celtiche (1972) - translated into English as The Celts, (Harvill Press 1996) and A Mid-Winter Morning's Dream (1971–1972)
Le Etiopiche (1972–1973)
Corte Sconta detta Arcana (1974)
Favola di Venezia (1976)
La casa dorata di Samarcanda (1980)
La giovinezza (1981)
Tango (1985)
Le elvetiche "Rosa Alchemica" (1987)
Mu (1988)
Gli scorpioni del deserto - Les Scorpions du Desert, The Scorpions of the Desert (1969–92)
Les Scorpions du désert (Episode 1, 1969–73)
Piccolo chalet... (1975)
Vanghe Dancale (1980)
Dry Martini Parlor (1982)
Brise de mer (1992)
L'uomo dei Caraibi (1977)
L'uomo del Sertao (1977)
L'uomo della Somalia (1979)
L'uomo del gran nord - Jesuit Joe (1980)
Tutto ricominciò con un'estate indiana (Indian Summer, 1983, with Milo Manara)
Cato Zulu (1984–88)
El Gaucho (1991), with Milo Manara
Saint-Exupéry - le dernier vol (1994)
Morgan (1995)

See also 
 Italian comics
 Letteratura disegnata

Notes

Sources

 Hugo Pratt dossier FFF 
 Hugo Pratt publications in Pif ,  (A SUIVRE), Pilote  and Le journal de Tintin  BDoubliées

External links 
 
Hugo Pratt official website
Hugo Pratt Archives
Hugo Pratt biography on Lambiek 
Biography by Paul Gravett Retrieved 14-05-2009
Hugo in Africa - a film by Stefano Knuchel 
La Casa di Corto Maltese - House Museum

1927 births
1995 deaths
Italian graphic novelists
People from Rimini
Artists from Venice
Italian comics artists
Italian comics writers
Will Eisner Award Hall of Fame inductees
20th-century Italian novelists
Italian people of Jewish descent
Grand Prix de la ville d'Angoulême winners